Qaleh Now (also Romanized as Qal`eh Now, Qal‘eh Nau, and Qal‘eh-ye Now; also known as Qal‘eh Now-ye Karīmbak, Qal‘eh Now-ye Karīm Bek, and Qal‘eh-ye Now Karīm Beyg) is a village in Hendudur Rural District, Sarband District, Shazand County, Markazi Province, Iran. At the 2006 census, its population was 226, in 50 families.

References 

Populated places in Shazand County